Carrie Westlake Whitney (1854 – April 8, 1934) was an American librarian. Known as the mother of Kansas City. Missouri's library system, she was the first director of the Kansas City Public Library. She moved to Kansas City and worked as a bookkeeper, renting a room from James Greenwood, the Kansas City superintendent. Greenwood hired her in 1881 when the library was still a subscription library, calling her "the smartest woman I have ever known."

By 1897, Whitney had fully ended the library's subscription model, and all city residents were allowed access to the library. The collection, which was described as "2,000 catalogued books, plus about a thousand volumes of government documents, reports, and periodicals," was enlarged to 30,000 items by 1897. By 1899, the solo library had grown to include a staff of 28 adults and nine young male pages. In 1901, she was elected to be the first president of the Missouri Library Association.

Whitney had strong opinions about reading, including keeping reading for younger people tightly controlled claiming, "One unwholesome book will contaminate an entire school."

In 1908, she published a three-volume history entitled Kansas City, Missouri: Its History and its People which included biographies of notable local people as well as a history of the city. She was demoted from her position to assistant librarian in 1910 with The Kansas City Journal saying her position should be held by a man, an opinion supported by the local Board of Education. She was replaced by Purd Wright—who had come back to Missouri after one year at the head of Los Angeles Public Library—and was terminated in 1912.

Personal life
Carrie Westlake was born in 1854 in Fayette County, Virginia, to Wellington and Helen Van Waters Westlake. In 1861, her family moved to Pettis County Missouri near Sedalia. In 1875, she married E. W. Judson in Sedalia. In 1885, she married newspaperman James Steele Whitney; he died in 1890. She spent the last four decades of her life living with Miss Frances Bishop, whom her obituary described as an "inseparable friend".

Carrie Whitney died on April 8, 1934, and is buried in the Forest Hill Calvary Cemetery in Kansas City, Missouri.

References

External links
 Kansas City, Missouri: Its History and its People at Internet Archive.

1854 births
1934 deaths
American librarians
American women librarians